Michael Tusiime (born 29 January 1972) is a Ugandan economist, tax consultant, administrator and politician. He is the elected Member of Parliament for Mbarara Municipality and a representative for NRM, the ruling political party in Uganda. Tusiime is a member of the Committee on Commissions, Statutory Authorities & State Enterprises and the Committee on Presidential Affairs in the 10th Parliament of Uganda.

Tusiime is the founding chairperson of Interventions For Rural Transformation (IFORT), the founding CEO of Tusiime Foundation, a board member of Iron Bridge Finance (IBF) and a resident research fellow at Agency for Transformation (AFT). He also worked in supervisory role with Uganda Revenue Authority (URA) from 1997 to 2010 and among other assignments; Tusiime formerly served as a liaison officer to the president of the Republic of Sierra Leone and as a research adviser to IMF's resident tax adviser in Uganda.

Early life and education
Tusiime was born in Mbarara District, Ankole sub-region, on 29 January 1972 in an Anglican family of the Banyankole. He had his primary education in his home district of Mbarara acquiring his PLE certification in 1986. He then attended Namilyango College for his O-Level education, attaining his UCE certification in 1990, and then Mbarara High School for his A-Level education where he acquired his UACE certification in 1993.

Tusiime further advanced to Makerere University where he graduated in 1997 with a Bachelor of Social Science in Economics. Still in the same institution of higher education, he acquired postgraduate certificates in Project Monitoring and Evaluation and another in Public administration and Management in the year 2012. Tusiime also holds a Master in Economic Policy & Planning from Makerere University and certificates in Arbitration & Alternative Dispute Resolution and another in Practical Skills & Techniques in International Negotiations, from the United Nations Institute for Training and Research (UNITAR) in Geneva. Tusiime is now a PhD student at the University For Graduate Studies in Management, UGSM – Monarch Business School in Switzerland.

Career
Upon acquiring his bachelor's degree, Tusiime took on supervisory roles at Uganda Revenue Authority, from 1997 to 2010, acquiring extensive knowledge in tax administration in the process.  In 2011, he founded Interventions For Rural Transformation (IFORT) and Tusiime Foundation; organizations in which he still serves to date as chairperson and chief executive officer respectively.

In 2010, Tusiime resigned from URA to join elective politics as an independent politician after temporarily falling out with the NRM during the ruling political party's primaries. On losing in the 2011 polls, Tusiime strategized for the 2016 parliamentary elections and returned on the NRM ticket, this time overpowering his nemesis Medard Bitekyerezo in the party's primaries and in the general elections and became a member of the 10th Parliament in the Pearl of Africa representing Mbarara Municipality.

In the 10th Parliament, Tusiime serves on the Committee on Commissions, Statutory Authorities and State Entreprises and the Committee on Presidential Affairs in the 10th Parliament of Uganda. In early 2017, Tusiime moved a motion that sought to investigate the circumstances under which a Shs6b ‘presidential handshake’ was shared out amongst 42 government officials without the knowledge of the Auditor General.

Personal details
Michael Tusiime is married to Prilla Kabagambe Tusiime and they have three children; Gareth Atamba Tusiime, Shane Akunda Tusiime and Michelle Amanda Tusiime.

See also
Mbarara District

References

External links
 Website of the Parliament of Uganda

Living people
1972 births
Members of the Parliament of Uganda
People from Mbarara District
Makerere University alumni
People from Western Region, Uganda
Active politicians
21st-century Ugandan politicians